Calixte "Charles" Payot (born 21 April 1901; date of death unknown) was a French ice hockey player. He competed in the men's tournaments at the 1924 Winter Olympics and the 1928 Winter Olympics.

References

1901 births
Year of death missing
Chamonix HC players
Ice hockey players at the 1924 Winter Olympics
Ice hockey players at the 1928 Winter Olympics
Olympic ice hockey players of France
People from Chamonix